This is a list of banks in North Korea.

List

Central bank 
 Central Bank of the Democratic People's Republic of Korea

Local banks 
 Chinmyong Joint Bank(진명합영은행)
 Civilian Cooperation Bank(민사협조은행)
 Daedong Credit Bank
 Daesong Bank
 Foreign Trade Bank of the Democratic People's Republic of Korea
 Kumgang Bank(금강은행)

Banks overseas 
 Golden Star Bank (closed in June 2004)
 Joson Trade Bank
 Danchon Bank (formerly called Chang-Kwang Credit Bank)
 Koryo Bank

See also

 Economy of North Korea

References 

North Korea
Banks
Banks

North Korea